The Mid Yorkshire Hospitals NHS Trust runs Pontefract Hospital, Pinderfields Hospital in Wakefield and Dewsbury and District Hospital and community health services in Wakefield, all in West Yorkshire, England.

It has been under financial pressure for many years. In April 2012 it was described as "among the small group of the most visibly troubled providers nationally" and the possibility that the trust would be split in three and joined with other local providers was considered.  In October 2013 it was proposing to reconfigure services between the three sites.

In November 2013 it was revealed that the beds at Dewsbury and District Hospital would drop from 360 to 110 if the radical shake-up went ahead.  The number of beds at Pinderfields would rise from 730 to 810.

Balfour Beatty built Pinderfields and Pontefract hospitals as part of a £311 million private finance initiative deal with Royal Bank of Scotland. They were leased back from the companies by the Trust over 35 years. In 2011, through its subsidiary Royal Bank Project Investments, RBS sold its 50% stake to HICL Infrastructure, an investment company originally set up by HSBC bank. Balfour Beatty sold its 50% interest in the hospitals for £61.5m, a profit of £42.2 million in October 2014. The trust makes payments of £38 million a year until 2042 plus inflated charges for minor works.

Kier Group has a £22 million contract to revamp Dewsbury and District Hospital.

Performance

It spent 6.9% of its total turnover on agency staff in 2014/5. In February 2016 it was expecting a deficit of £23.4 million for the year 2015/6.

In January 2018 patients were pictured sleeping on the bare floors of Pinderfields Hospital.

See also
 Kate Granger
 List of hospitals in England
 List of NHS trusts
 HWD Hospital Radio

References

NHS hospital trusts
Health in Yorkshire
Pontefract
Wakefield
Dewsbury